Leipzig Riverside Forest (German: Leipziger Auenwald) is one of the largest lowland Riparian forests in Central Europe, which lies mostly within the city limits of Leipzig city in Germany. The natural reserve is partially covered with hardwood forest and contains a large variety of endangered species.

Location 

Leipzig Riverside Forest is divided into separate southern and northern parts, between which is a corridor containing many parks and green areas along the banks of the White Elster. Between the two there is a certain ecological link through a corridor that comprises parks and grassland and which lies along the Elster Basin, which was constructed to provide flood protection, the Elster flood plain and other water bodies of the Leipzig River Network. The total area covered is approx. 2500 hectares.  

Leipzig Riverside Forest is a nature reserve.

Flora and Fauna

Plants 
Originally, the hardwood forest hosted more elms and black poplars which have become rare over the years, however the amount of  old oaks with massive stems is still remarkable. The mixed forest contains may different tree species, almost half of them are either ash, maple or sycamore maple. Also found are small-leaved linden, common horn beam and 
various kinds of willows.
In spring, the ground is covered with wild garlic, sprinkled with spring snowflakes and crested lark in colors ranging from white and pink to purple. Some rather rare plants like the Geum rivale can also be found in the wet, almost swampy parts of the area.

Animals 
The common kingfisher has become quite rare in Germany, especially due to loss of habitat. Kingfishers rely on clean, flowing water with a multitude of small fish and breeding sites in the riverside forest. They are still considered to be endangered, and so enjoy special protection, as a result, some waterways are closed-off from tourist paddling during the breeding season.
Inhabiting the forest are red squirrels and a multitude of woodpeckers, such as the great spotted woodpecker, as well as the black woodpecker and the European green woodpecker.

Literature 
 ENEDAS e. V./ Autorenkollektiv: Der Leipziger Auwald. Ein Natur- und Erlebnisführer. Edition Leipzig, 2013, .
 Gerd K. Müller (ed.): Der Leipziger Auwald – ein verkanntes Juwel der Natur. Leipzig, 1992.
 Gerd K. Müller: Die Leipziger Auen. Staatsministerium für Umwelt und Landesentwicklung, Dresden, 1995.

References

External links 

 Leipzig Municipal Forest on the City of Leipzig website
 Auwald Leipzig – Website of Society for Environmental Education and Research
 Private website –  with information about the history, extent, soil and climate of the forest

Forests and woodlands of Saxony
Geography of Leipzig